Nitrosyl chloride is the chemical compound with the formula NOCl. It is a yellow gas that is commonly encountered as a component of aqua regia, a mixture of 3 parts concentrated hydrochloric acid and 1 part of  concentrated nitric acid. It is a strong electrophile and oxidizing agent. It is sometimes called Tilden's reagent, after William A. Tilden, who was the first to produce it as a pure compound.

Structure and synthesis
The molecule is bent. A double bond exists between N and O (distance = 1.16 Å) and a single bond between N and Cl (distance = 1.96 Å). The O=N–Cl angle is 113°.

Production
Nitrosyl chloride can be produced in many ways.

 Combining nitrosylsulfuric acid and HCl affords the compound. This method is used industrially.
HCl + NOHSO4 → H2SO4 + NOCl

 A more convenient laboratory method involves the (reversible) dehydration of nitrous acid by HCl
 HNO2 + HCl → H2O + NOCl

 By the direct combination of chlorine and nitric oxide; This reaction reverses above 100 °C.
 Cl2 + 2 NO → 2 NOCl

 By reduction of nitrogen dioxide with hydrogen chloride:
 2NO2 + 4 HCl → 2NOCl + 2H2O + Cl2

Occurrence in aqua regia
NOCl also arises from the combination of hydrochloric and nitric acids according to the following reaction:
HNO3 + 3 HCl → 2[Cl] + 2 H2O + NOCl
In nitric acid, NOCl is readily oxidized into nitrogen dioxide. The presence of NOCl in aqua regia was described by Edmund Davy in 1831.

Reactions
NOCl behaves as an electrophile and an oxidant in most of its reactions. With halide acceptors, for example antimony pentachloride, converts to nitrosonium salts:
 NOCl + SbCl5 → [NO]+[SbCl6]−
In a related reaction, sulfuric acid gives nitrosylsulfuric acid, the mixed acid anhydride of nitrous and sulfuric acid:
 ClNO + H2SO4 → ONHSO4 + HCl

NOCl reacts with silver thiocyanate to give silver chloride and the pseudohalogen nitrosyl thiocyanate:
 ClNO + AgSCN → AgCl + ONSCN
Similarly, it reacts with silver cyanide to give nitrosyl cyanide.  

Nitrosyl chloride is used to prepare metal nitrosyl complexes. With molybdenum hexacarbonyl, NOCl gives the dinitrosyldichloride complex:
Mo(CO)6 + 2 NOCl → MoCl2(NO)2 + 6 CO

It dissolves platinum:
Pt  + 6 NOCl → (NO+)2[PtCl6]2- + 4 NO

Applications in organic synthesis
Aside from its role in the production of caprolactam, NOCl finds some other uses in organic synthesis. It adds to alkenes to afford α-chloro oximes. The addition of NOCl follows the Markovnikov rule. Ketenes also add NOCl, giving nitrosyl derivatives:
 H2C=C=O + NOCl → ONCH2C(O)Cl

Epoxides react with NOCl to give an α-chloronitritoalkyl derivatives.  In the case of propylene oxide, the addition proceeds with high regiochemistry:

It converts amides to N-nitroso derivatives. NOCl converts some cyclic amines to the alkenes. For example, aziridine reacts with NOCl to give ethene, nitrous oxide and hydrogen chloride.

Industrial applications
NOCl and cyclohexane react photochemically to give cyclohexanone oxime hydrochloride. This process exploits the tendency of NOCl to undergo photodissociation into NO and Cl radicals. The cyclohexanone oxime is converted to caprolactam, a precursor to nylon-6.

Safety
Nitrosyl chloride is very toxic and irritating to the lungs, eyes, and skin.

References

External links

Chloride
Oxychlorides
Nitrogen(III) compounds
Nitrogen oxohalides
Gases with color